This article presents a list of the historical events and publications of Australian literature during 1864.

Events 

 The Australasian newspaper publishes its first issue on 1 October. It would continue publishing under this name until 6 April 1946.

Books 

 Louisa Atkinson – Myra
 Henry Newton Goodrich – Raven Rockstrow or, The Pedlar's Dream : A Romance of Melbourne
 Catherine Helen Spence – Mr. Hogarth's Will
 Eliza Winstanley – Twenty Straws

Short stories 

 J. R. Houlding
 "Don't Forget Your Poor Old Mother"
 "Mr. Phiggs and His Christmas Breakfast"

Poetry 

 Adam Lindsay Gordon
 "The Feud"
 "Verses Inspired by My Old Black Pipe"
 Henry Kendall
 "Faith in God"
 "Ghost Glen"
 "The Last of His Tribe"
 J. Sheridan Moore – Spring-Life Lyrics
 Charles Thatcher – Thatcher's Colonial Minstrel : new collection of songs

Births 

A list, ordered by date of birth (and, if the date is either unspecified or repeated, ordered alphabetically by surname) of births in 1864 of Australian literary figures, authors of written works or literature-related individuals follows, including year of death.

 23 January – Constance Le Plastrier, writer, schoolteacher and botanist (died 1938)
17 February – Banjo Paterson, poet and writer (died 1941)
 23 August – Agnes L. Storrie, poet and writer (died 1936)
 30 November – Sydney Jephcott, poet (died 1951)
 9 December – Breaker Morant, poet and soldier (died 1902)
Unknown date

 Laura Palmer-Archer, short story writer, wrote as Bushwoman (died 1929)

See also 
 1864 in Australia
 1864 in literature
 1864 in poetry
 List of years in Australian literature
 List of years in literature

References

 
Australia
19th-century Australian literature
Australian literature by year